Tricyphistis is a genus of moth in the family Gelechiidae. It contains the species Tricyphistis cyanorma, which is found in Taiwan.

References

Gelechiinae